Myrmolaelaps is a genus of mites in the family Laelapidae.

Species
 Myrmolaelaps equitans Trägårdh, 1906

References

Acari genera
Laelapidae